Games played (most often abbreviated as G or GP) is a statistic used in team sports to indicate the total number of games in which a player has participated (in any capacity); the statistic is generally applied irrespective of whatever portion of the game is contested. In baseball, the statistic applies also to players who, prior to a game, are included on a starting lineup card or are announced as ex ante substitutes, whether or not they play; however, in Major League Baseball, the application of this statistic does not extend to consecutive games played streaks. A starting pitcher, then, may be credited with a game played even if he is not credited with a game started or an inning pitched. Third base is the third of four stations on a baseball diamond which must be touched in succession by a baserunner in order to score a run for that player's team. A third baseman, abbreviated 3B, is the player on the team playing defense who fields the area nearest third base, and is responsible for the majority of plays made at that base. In the scoring system used to record defensive plays, the third baseman is assigned the number 5.

Because third basemen routinely have to make the longest throws across the infield, and because of increasing expectations of their offensive contributions, they tend to be physically larger than middle infielders; however, they are generally expected to be quicker than first basemen, and the physical demands of playing third base have historically hindered players from having long careers at the position. When Eddie Yost became the first player to play 2,000 major league games at third base in 1962, it was nearly forty years after most other non-pitching positions had seen a player reach that milestone; the only position that took longer was catcher. Only 13 players have played 2,000 major league games at third base, tied for the fewest among infield positions; only three of the top 25 career leaders were in the major leagues before 1944, none of them before 1920. Brooks Robinson is the all-time leader in career games as a third baseman, playing 2,870 games at the position; it is the most games played at a single position by any player in major league history, and exceeded the previous record at the position by nearly 700 games. Adrián Beltré (2,759), Graig Nettles (2,412), Gary Gaetti (2,282), Wade Boggs (2,215), Mike Schmidt (2,212), Buddy Bell (2,183), Eddie Mathews (2,181), Ron Santo (2,130), Aramis Ramírez (2,112), Tim Wallach (2,054), Scott Rolen (2,023), and Eddie Yost (2,008) are the only other players to appear in over 2,000 career games at third base.

Key

List

Stats updated as of the end of the 2022 season.

Other Hall of Famers

Notes

References

External links

Major League Baseball statistics
Games played as a third baseman